Sinđelić may refer to:

"Sinđelić" Theatre or National Theatre in Niš, Serbia
FK Sinđelić Beograd, football club from the city of Belgrade, Serbia
FK Sinđelić Niš, football club from the city of Niš, Serbia
Stevan Sinđelić (1770–1809), military commander in the Serbian Revolutionary Army

Matronymic surnames
Serbian surnames